Wisecrack, inc. is an American film and video production company operated by Jacob Salamon, Jared Bauer, Greg Edwards, Drew Levin, and Todd Mendeloff. The company was founded in 2014 and produces various web series and podcasts such as Thug Notes, Earthling Cinema, and 8-Bit Philosophy. The group is focused on an analysis of anime, film, literature, and video games drawing out philosophy, sociology, psychology and other meanings that can be interpreted from media. Wisecrack was purchased by Blue Ant Media in August, 2019.

Web series
Earthling Cinema stars actor-comedian Mark Schroeder as Garyx Wormuloid, an extraterrestrial being with huge eyebrows from the distant future wherein the human species has long since gone extinct, who examines classic and contemporary films such as Frozen, The Purge, and The Matrix. 
Thug Notes stars actor-comedian Greg Edwards as Sparky Sweets, Ph.D., a stereotypical gangster who presents literary analysis of classic and popular literature such as The Great Gatsby, Dracula and Beloved.
8-bit Philosophy, produced and animated by MB X McClain, explores philosophical questions with narration by Nathan Lowe. Usually each episode is set in the style of a classic game from the 80s or 90s, and the series had some reoccurring gags. Music was provided by David Krystal. The series concluded in 2016.
Boss Bitches Of History, written and hosted by pornographic actors Ela Darling and Sovereign Syre, explores the lives of strong women throughout history such as Cleopatra and Marie-Joseph Angélique.
Wisecrack Edition
Pop Psych

Podcasts 

 The Squanch a Rick and Morty analysis podcast.
 Show Me the Meaning! a podcast that analyzes an eclectic mix of movies.
 The Maze a Westworld podcast. 
 Respect Our Authoritah! a South Park podcast. 
 Thug Notes: Get Lit! a podcast companion to the popular web series. While the web series covers individual literary works, each entry in this podcast covers a literary theme and not a specific literary work.   
Culture Binge a current pop culture discussion/analysis podcast.

References

External links
 

2014 web series debuts
Online edutainment
Reading and literacy television series
YouTube original programming
American non-fiction web series
Philosophy television series